Krasnoarmeysky District is an administrative district (raion), one of the thirty-eight in Krasnodar Krai, Russia. As a municipal division, it is incorporated as Krasnoarmeysky Municipal District. It is located in the center of the krai. Its administrative center is the rural locality (a stanitsa) of Poltavskaya. Population:  The population of Poltavskaya accounts for 25.8% of the district's total population.

Notable people
Vladimir Abazarov, discoverer of the largest Russian Samotlor oil field

References

Notes

Sources

Districts of Krasnodar Krai
 
